Marc Vicente Vidal Girona (born 14 February 2000) is a Spanish footballer who plays as a goalkeeper for FC Andorra.

Club career
Born in Villarreal, Castellón, Valencian Community, Vidal was a Villarreal CF youth graduate. He made his senior debut with the C-team on 1 September 2018, starting in a 2–0 Tercera División home win over Elche CF Ilicitano.

Promoted to the reserves in Segunda División B ahead of the 2020–21 season, Vidal was mainly a backup option to Filip Jörgensen before moving to another reserve team – Betis Deportivo Balompié – on 10 June 2021.

On 9 July 2022, Vidal signed a two-year contract with Segunda División newcomers FC Andorra. He made his debut for the club on 12 November, starting in a 3–1 away win over CD Manacor, for the season's Copa del Rey.

Vidal made his professional debut on 21 December 2022, playing the full 90 minutes in a 2–1 loss at Levante UD, also for the national cup.

References

External links

2000 births
Living people
People from Villarreal
Spanish footballers
Footballers from the Valencian Community
Association football goalkeepers
Primera Federación players
Segunda División B players
Tercera División players
Villarreal CF C players
Villarreal CF B players
Betis Deportivo Balompié footballers
FC Andorra players
Spain youth international footballers
Spanish expatriate footballers
Expatriate footballers in Andorra
Spanish expatriate sportspeople in Andorra